William Bower may refer to:
William H. Bower (1850–1910), lawyer and United States Representative in Congress
William Bower (cricketer) (1857–1943), English first-class cricketer
Bill Bower (1917–2011), American aviator, last surviving pilot of the Doolittle Raid

See also
William Bowers (disambiguation)